Calusco d'Adda (Bergamasque,) is a comune (municipality) in the Province of Bergamo in the Italian region of Lombardy, located about  northeast of Milan and about  west of Bergamo.  

Calusco d'Adda borders the following municipalities: Carvico, Medolago, Paderno d'Adda, Robbiate, Solza, Terno d'Isola, Villa d'Adda.

Twin towns — sister cities
Calusco d'Adda is twinned with:

  Volmerange-les-Mines, France

References

External links
 Official website